The 1999 World Grand Prix was the second staging of a darts tournament organised by the Professional Darts Corporation (PDC) and held at the Casino Rooms in Rochester, England between 20–24 October 1999. 

The format changed to feature four groups of four players. As in the previous year, players had to start each leg by hitting a double - in addition to the traditional double to finish. The tournament was played in the format of best of five legs per set, rather than the best of three legs which had been adopted in 1998. 

Phil Taylor retained the title, beating Shayne Burgess 6-1 in the final. Taylor's only close match came in the semi-finals, where he defeated Rod Harrington 5-4.

Seeds

Group stage format
The format employed for this tournament meant that players could still qualify for the quarter-finals even if they lost either of their first two matches. The format was thus.
 Match 1: Player A v Player B
 Match 2: Player C v Player D
 Match 3: Winner of match 1 v Winner of Match 2 (winner goes into quarter finals)
 Match 4: Loser of match 1 v Loser of Match 2
 Match 5: Winner of match 4 v Loser of Match 3 (winner goes into quarter finals)

Results

Group stages
20–21 October 1999

Group 1

Group 2

Group 3

Group 4

Knockout stages

World Grand Prix (darts)
World Grand Prix Darts